Illeana Hesselberg (born July 25, 1961 or 1965), known professionally as Illeana Douglas, is an American actress and filmmaker. She appeared in three episodes of Six Feet Under, for which she received a Primetime Emmy Award nomination as Outstanding Guest Actress in a Drama Series and won the Best Guest Actress in a Drama Series award from OFTA, the Online Film & Television Association, and in the TV series Action opposite Jay Mohr, for which she won a Satellite Award for Best Actress – Television Series Musical or Comedy. , she can be seen on Turner Classic Movies where she hosts specials focused on unheralded women directors from film history.

Early life 
Douglas was born in Quincy, Massachusetts, the daughter of Joan Douglas (née Georgescu), a schoolteacher, and Gregory Hesselberg, a painter. Douglas's father was the son of Hollywood actor Melvyn Douglas and his wife, the artist Rosalind Hightower. Douglas had two older brothers, the late Stefan Gregor Hesselberg, a technician in the histology laboratory at the Massachusetts Institute of Technology who also trained racehorses in Verona, Italy, and Erik Hesselberg, a journalist.

Douglas grew up in Connecticut, in the Old Saybrook area, and has said that she was also raised in many other cities, in Massachusetts where her father lived, Connecticut where her mother lived, and New York, where her extended family lived. During her childhood she spent time going back and forth between relatives during the summer. Douglas said that her parents were heavily influenced by the 1970s hippie culture—her father especially by the movie Easy Rider. They had a loose parenting style and did not pressure her to go to college. Comedy albums were popular in her family. They would put on dramatic interpretations and performances.

Douglas's mother's side is Roman Catholic—Italian and Romanian from Astoria, Queens. Her maternal grandmother worked in the restaurant at Gertz department store in Astoria; her maternal grandfather was a welder. Douglas said that her maternal grandmother, a former Rockette, had wanted to be an actor. She instilled in Douglas a love for the movies, which they attended together frequently when she was a child.

As a child she would visit her paternal grandfather, the actor Melvyn Douglas, in his apartment in Manhattan on the Upper West Side as well as at his home in the Hollywood Hills section of Los Angeles. Douglas said that during her summers with her grandfather, he introduced her to his interests, which included theater, elocution, reading, art, and history.

Douglas has said that her grandfather's performance in Being There was influential on her own career. In the 1940s, Douglas' grandfather and Peter Sellers both served in the military during WWII and met in Burma. In the 1960s, the two men reconnected in London and talked about their time together in the war. During high school, Douglas visited the set while they were shooting on location in Asheville, North Carolina and met Sellers, whose work she admired greatly. It was the first time she was on a film set.

Douglas notes the contrast between her working-class Italian roots and the glamorous Hollywood world of her paternal side of the family. Famous people including Myrna Loy, Gore Vidal, Gloria Steinem, politicians, writers, and others were often present, in a salon-like environment. Douglas has said it took her a long time to reconcile the different lifestyles she was exposed to in her youth. She identifies more with the Italian side of her family, and has said that she developed more of their "rhythms and ways" due to the amount of time she spent with them in Queens.

Career

Early career 

After graduating from high school, Douglas moved to New York City. Having been interested in movies from her childhood, Douglas wanted to be in show business. She stayed with relatives in various temporary arrangements. Douglas attended American Academy of Dramatic Arts, where she was a contemporary of Elias Koteas and Lou Mustillo.  Following their first year, Mustillo and Douglas were not invited back to the school.

When she was 18 years old, Douglas went to work for Steve Rubell at the Morgans Hotel. While there, Douglas decided to reinvent herself, and began attending Neighborhood Playhouse School of the Theatre, where she studied with the acting teacher Richard Pinter. While she was working in a sketch comedy group called Manhattan Punchline, one of the troupe members suggested she try stand-up comedy. Douglas worked briefly at Stand Up New York, and found the writing and acting easy, but found the performing difficult. She did not like the raw comedy style then in vogue, and did not enjoy the lifestyle of a standup comic.

Douglas began working for a well-known publicist, Peggy Siegal. Through this position, she tried to send her headshot to Martin Scorsese's casting director,  but was not successful. At that time, Scorsese was editing his film Last Temptation of Christ in an office down the hall from Siegal's offices. The editors needed a sound effect to convey Mary Magdalene screaming, and asked her to help out. In this way, Douglas met Scorsese, his editor, Thelma Schoonmaker, as well as filmmaker Michael Powell, and provided many ADR of crowd sounds. The group bonded over discussion of old films, which was a long-standing interest. Scorsese and Douglas eventually began a long-term relationship.

Soon afterwards, she got her first movie role: a small part in Scorsese's segment of New York Stories. Douglas said that Lorraine Bracco took Douglas under her wing during the shooting of Scorsese's Goodfellas, helping her to find an agent. It was then that Douglas became Scorsese's girlfriend.

Douglas appeared in Scorsese's Cape Fear (1991) – one of four Scorsese films in which she has appeared. After Cape Fear, she had several film roles where her character was eventually cut, including in Household Saints, Jungle Fever, and Quiz Show. "It was kind of depressing," she commented.

Douglas acted in a low-budget movie called Grief that was accepted into  Sundance, which led to her meeting director Allison Anders.

Feature work 
Douglas had a supporting role in 1995's To Die For, a film that boosted her career in which the director Gus Van Sant taught her about the technical aspects of filmmaking, such as camera blocking, film lenses, and modulating a performance for film. It was also a movie where she felt that the Meisner technique she learned at the Neighborhood Playhouse started to connect for her.

Douglas and Allison Anders wanted to collaborate on a film, and began work on a biography of Anne Sexton, which never came to fruition. As they were both interested in music, Douglas suggested a movie about the personalities of the Brill Building, where she had worked. This led to her first starring role as singer-songwriter Denise Waverly in Anders' 1996 film, Grace of My Heart.

She had another supporting role in Ghost World (2001).

In 2016, Douglas appeared opposite Sean Astin in the independent feature film, Unleashed.

Television work 
On television, Douglas appeared in a memorable role as one of Garry Shandling's love interests towards the end of the series, The Larry Sanders Show, in 1998. In 1999, she had a starring role opposite Jay Mohr in the series Action. She played a television executive who started out as a prostitute who had Mohr as a regular customer.

She guest starred on Seinfeld, Frasier and The Drew Carey Show, and has played a public defender on several episodes of Law & Order: Special Victims Unit in 2002 and 2003. She appeared in two episodes of the HBO TV series Six Feet Under, both of which earned Emmy nominations for Guest Actress in a Drama. She appeared as Mrs. Ari's sister Marci in the Season 7 finale of Entourage.

In 2006, she starred in the Lifetime TV film Not Like Everyone Else and played herself in Pittsburgh opposite Jeff Goldblum. In 2007, Douglas was added to the cast of Ugly Betty, playing Sheila, an editor for MODE magazine.

Douglas spent time in Sweden shooting a TV show called Welcome to Sweden, which was produced by Amy Poehler and also starred Greg Poehler and Lena Olin. The series was a Swedish-American co-production that aired on Swedish TV as well as on NBC.

Writing and producing 
Douglas has written and directed a comedy short The Perfect Woman (1993) (a satire about what men really want from women), the documentary Everybody Just Stay Calm—Stories in Independent Filmmaking (1994), and the satire Boy Crazy, Girl Crazier (1995). She has been the producer for several projects including Illeanarama, a collection of her short films for the Sundance Channel.

From 2008 to 2012, Douglas starred in a web series sponsored by IKEA called Easy to Assemble, where she plays herself as an actor-in-recovery-from-acting who goes to work at IKEA. Douglas said that she had a great deal of autonomy from sponsor IKEA, whose only condition was that the show be suitable for children and families. It was canceled after 4 seasons.

In 2015, Douglas produced and mentored women filmmakers in developing a web-series for Jill Soloway called The Skinny.

Turner Classic Movies 
Douglas worked on a Turner Classic Movies series called Friday Night Spotlight, a prime-time show featuring a month-long festival of movies programmed by special guests. The season that she worked on focused on the theme "Second Looks". Douglas said that curating, writing, and working on this series allowed her to use her movie knowledge while making it funny, entertaining, and informative.

In 2015, in association with the advocacy group, Women in Film, Douglas presented a month-long series on the TCM cable channel called "Trailblazing Women," an initiative to highlight women's contributions to the art of cinema. Douglas became involved in the project when she found out that the American Film Institute's list of 100 greatest American movies didn't include any movies directed by women. The series was also in response to active discussions about the gender imbalance in Hollywood. The series will present work by female pioneers like Dorothy Arzner, Alice Guy-Blaché, Agnès Varda, Lina Wertmüller, as well as interviews with Allison Anders, Amy Heckerling, Julie Dash, and others. The series will be a multi-year event, with the first year's focus on women directors from the 1920s to the present. Each night is themed, with programming topics from foreign films to African-American filmmakers.

Other work 
 In Spärhusen, a spinoff series from Easy to Assemble, Douglas plays Beirget Kattsson, a member of a band called Spärhusen, a Swedish pop group. Douglas describes them: "Spärhusen has had their ups and downs over the years. They’ve been in many plane crashes, but they’ve survived and they’re together."
 At the Walt Disney World Resort in the Disney's Hollywood Studios theme park, Douglas plays Aerosmith's manager in the preshow video for the Rock 'n' Roller Coaster attraction. She later appeared in an Aerosmith music video as Liv Tyler's mother.
 Douglas and the comedian Sarah Sweet produced and co-starred in a series professional variety shows called The Living Room Show, that is hosted in various Los Angeles living rooms.

In 2015 Douglas published a memoir called I Blame Dennis Hopper which was released through Flatiron Books. In the memoir, Douglas tells about her life via her love for the movies and her exposure to Hollywood through her paternal grandfather Melvyn Douglas. Not long after the book's release, she began a podcast with the same title.

Personal life 
From 1989 until 1997, Douglas was in a relationship with director Martin Scorsese.

On May 16, 1998, she married producer and writer Jonathan Axelrod, the stepson of producer George Axelrod; they divorced in 2001. Douglas said that the period after her divorce was difficult both emotionally and financially, and that she relocated from living in Los Angeles to the New York area, where she took classes at her former school, the Neighborhood Playhouse, and worked in theater. She also began writing and directing.

Douglas is a vegetarian. She was named after Princess Ileana of Romania.

Works and publications

Filmography

Film

Television

Streaming television

References

External links 

 
 
 Illeana Douglas at the British Film Institute
 "Illeana Douglas, Renaissance Woman," 2016 interview in Screen Comment

Actresses from Massachusetts
Actresses from New York City
American film actresses
American people of Romanian descent
American people of Latvian-Jewish descent
American television actresses
American women film directors
Living people
Writers from Quincy, Massachusetts
American web series actresses
21st-century American actresses
Film directors from Massachusetts
American people of Italian descent
Age controversies
1961 births